Irena Degutienė (born 1 June 1949) is a Lithuanian politician and member of the conservative Homeland Union. She is currently the Deputy Speaker of Seimas, and was twice the acting Prime Minister of Lithuania, first from 4 May 1999 to 18 May 1999 and then from 27 October 1999 to 3 November 1999. She has also been the Speaker of Seimas from 15 September 2009 to 14 September 2012, as well as Minister for Social Security and Labour from 1996 to 2000. In 1978, she graduated from Vilnius University with a degree in medicine. For almost twenty years, she worked in Vilnius Red Cross Hospital before becoming a secretary in the Ministry of Health in 1994. She was initially elected to Seimas in 1996. Degutienė is the first woman to be Speaker of Seimas in Lithuania's history.

MG Baltic bribery scandal 
In 2017, Eligijus Masiulis 250-thousand-euro bribery scandal sparked one of the largest corruption investigations in Lithuania's history. Secret surveillance by VSD revealed that MG Baltic, a Lithuanian conglomerate, has been exerting influence and systematically bribing prosecutors, politicians and government bureaucrats. Irena Degutienė is implicated in the corruption scandal – MG Baltic preferred and favoured her nomination as head of her political party.

Honours

National honours
 Grand Cross of the Order of Vytautas the Great (6 July 2019)

References 

 Profile on the Seimas website

|-

|-

Living people
1949 births
20th-century women rulers
21st-century Lithuanian women politicians
20th-century Lithuanian women politicians
Women Speakers of the Seimas
Ministers of Social Security and Labour of Lithuania
People from Šiauliai
Prime Ministers of Lithuania
Vilnius University alumni
Women government ministers of Lithuania
Women prime ministers